The FEniCS Project is a collection of free and open-source software components with the common goal to enable automated solution of differential equations. The components provide scientific computing tools for working with computational meshes,
finite-element variational formulations of ordinary and partial differential equations, and numerical linear algebra.

Design and components 

The FEniCS Project is designed as an umbrella project for a collection of interoperable components. The core components are 

 UFL (Unified Form Language), a domain-specific language embedded in Python for specifying finite element discretizations of differential equations in terms of finite element variational forms;
 FIAT (Finite element Automatic Tabulator), the finite element backend of FEniCS, a Python module for generation of arbitrary order finite element basis functions on simplices;
 FFC (FEniCS Form Compiler), a compiler for finite element variational forms taking UFL code as input and generating UFC output;
 UFC (Unified Form-assembly Code), a C++ interface consisting of low-level functions for evaluating and assembling finite element variational forms;
 Instant, a Python module for inlining C and C++ code in Python;
 DOLFIN, a C++/Python library providing data structures and algorithms for finite element meshes, automated finite element assembly, and numerical linear algebra.

DOLFIN, the computational high-performance C++ backend of FEniCS, functions as the main problem-solving environment (in both C++ and Python) and user interface. Its functionality integrates the other FEniCS components and handles communication with external libraries such as PETSc, Trilinos and Eigen for numerical linear algebra, ParMETIS and SCOTCH for mesh partitioning, and MPI and OpenMP for distributed computing.

History 

The FEniCS Project was initiated in 2003 as a research collaboration between the University of Chicago and Chalmers University of Technology. The following institutions are currently, or have been, actively involved in the development of the project

 Argonne National Laboratory
 Chalmers University of Technology
 Charles University
 Delft University of Technology
 Royal Institute of Technology
 Simula Research Laboratory
 University of Cambridge
 University of Chicago
 University of Luxembourg

Since 2019 a refactoring of code is in work of progress.

See also 
 List of finite element software packages
 List of numerical analysis software
 Using the FEATool Multiphysics GUI to set up and solve FEniCS multiphysics models

References

External links
 The FEniCS project on Bitbucket

Scientific simulation software
Finite element software
Finite element software for Linux
Free software programmed in Python
Free software programmed in C++